Simon of Bisignano was a teacher of canon law in Bologna in the 1170s. He composed a Summa on the Decretum Gratiani between March 1177 and March 1179. Like Paucapalea, he, too, might have been a student of Gratian himself.

Notes 

People from Calabria
12th-century Italian jurists